This is a list of articles related to the JavaScript programming language.

0-9 
 24SevenOffice

A 
 A-Frame (virtual reality framework)
 AJAX.OOP
 ASP.NET AJAX
 Ace (editor)
 ActionScript
 Adaptive web design
 Ajax (programming)
 Ajax4jsf
 AjaxView
 Angular (application platform)
 AngularJS
 AnyChart
 Appcelerator
 Asm.js
 Asynchronous module definition
 AtScript
 Atom (text editor)

B 
 BONDI (OMTP)
 BSON
 Backbone.js
 Bindows
 Blend4Web
 Blockly
 Bookmarklet
 Bootstrap (front-end framework)
 Brendan Eich
 Browserify

C 
 CKEditor
 COLT (software)
 CSS framework
 Chakra (JScript engine)
 Chakra (JavaScript engine)
 Chart.js
 Citadel/UX
 CodeMirror
 CoffeeScript
 Comet (programming)
 CommonJS
 Comparison of JavaScript frameworks
 Comparison of JavaScript-based source code editors
 ContentTools
 CopperLicht
 Cross-origin resource sharing
 Crypton (framework)
 CssQuery
 Cytoscape

D 

 D3.js
 Direct Web Remoting
 DaVinci (software)
 Dart (programming language)
 Document Update Markup Language
 DocumentCloud
 Dojo Toolkit
 Douglas Crockford
 Dropbox Paper

E 

 ECMAScript
 Echo (framework)
 Electron (software framework)
 Ember.js
 Emscripten
 Enyo (software)
 Etherpad
 EveryBit.js
 Express.js
 Ext JS
 Ext.NET

F 

 FUEL (Firefox User Extension Library)
 Firebug (software)
 Foswiki
 Frank Karlitschek
 FuncJS
 FusionCharts

G 

 GNU LibreJS
 GeoJSON
 Ghost (blogging platform)
 Globalize
 Glow (JavaScript library)
 Gollum browser
 Google APIs
 Google Apps Script
 Google Charts
 Google Closure Tools
 Google Docs, Sheets and Slides
 Google Web Toolkit
 Greasemonkey
 Grunt (software)
 Gson
 Gulp.js

H 

 HOCON
 HTTPS Everywhere
 Helmi Technologies
 Highcharts
 Hypertext Application Language

I 

 ICEfaces
 IUI (software)
 Immediately-invoked function expression
 InScript (JavaScript engine)
 Ionic (mobile app framework)

J 

 JPlayer
 JQT (software)
 JQWidgets
 jQuery
 jQuery Mobile
 jQuery UI
 JSDoc
 JSGI
 JSHint
 JSLint
 JSON
 JSON Patch
 JSON streaming
 JSON Web Signature
 JSON Web Token
 JSON-LD
 JSON-RPC
 JSON-WSP
 JSONP
 JSONiq
 JSSP
 JScript
 JScript .NET
 JWt (Java web toolkit)
 Jackson (API)
 Jan-Christoph Borchardt
 Jaql
 Jasmine (JavaScript testing framework)
 JavaPoly
 JavaScript
 JavaScript InfoVis Toolkit
 JavaScript Style Sheets
 JavaScript engine
 JavaScript framework
 JavaScript graphics library
 JavaScript library
 JavaScript syntax
 JavaScript templating
 JavaScriptMVC
 JerryScript
 John Resig
 Joose (framework)
 JsMath
 JsPHP
 JsSIP
 Jscrambler
 JsonML

K 

 KaTeX
 Knockout (web framework)
 Kopano (software)

L 

 Leaflet (software)
 Less (stylesheet language)
 Lightbox (JavaScript)
 List of ECMAScript engines
 List of JavaScript libraries
 LiveScript
 Lively Kernel
 Locker (software)
 Lodash

M 

 Mailvelope
 MathJax
 Media queries
 Meteor (web framework)
 Midori JavaScript Framework
 MindMup
 Minification (programming)
 Mocha (JavaScript framework)
 MochiKit
 Modernizr
 Monaca (software)
 MontageJS
 MooTools
 Morfik
 Morfik FX
 Mozilla Raindrop
 Mustache (template system)

N 

 Nashorn (JavaScript engine)
 NativeScript
 Nextcloud
 Node-RED
 Node.js
 Npm (software)

O 

 ORBX.js
 Objective-J
 OpenAjax Alliance
 OpenLaszlo
 OpenLayers
 OpenUI5
 OpenWebGlobe
 OwnCloud

P 

 PDF.js
 PM2 (software)
 Parallax scrolling
 Pentadactyl
 Plotly
 Polymer (library)
 Popcorn.js
 PostCSS
 Processing.js
 Progressive enhancement
 Projax
 Prototype JavaScript Framework
 Push technology
 Pyjs

Q 

 QUnit
 Qooxdoo
 QtScript
 Quicknet

R 

 Raphaël (JavaScript library)
 React (JavaScript library)
 Redux (JavaScript library)
 RGraph
 Rhino (JavaScript engine)
 River Trail (JavaScript engine)

S 

 Sajax
 Samy (computer worm)
 Seed (programming)
 Sencha Touch
 Server-side JavaScript implementations
 Serverless Framework
 ShapeJS
 Smart client
 Smile (data interchange format)
 SnapEditor
 SOAPjr
 Socket.IO
 SpiderMonkey
 SproutCore
 Spry framework
 Starling Framework
 StormEngineC
 Study Notes
 Svelte
 SVG-edit
 SWFObject

T 

 Taiwan Fellowship Editor (e-book editor)
 Template:JavaScript
 ThinkFree Office
 Three.js
 TiddlyWiki
 TinyMCE
 TypeScript

U 

 Underscore.js
 Unit.js
 Unobtrusive JavaScript

V 

 Velocity (JavaScript library)
 Verge3D
 VisualEditor
 Vue.js
 V8 (JavaScript engine)

W 

 WAI-ARIA
 WYMeditor
 Wakanda (software)
 WaveMaker
 Web Application Messaging Protocol
 WebApp.Net
 Webix
 Webpack
 WebTorrent
 WinJS
 Wink toolkit
 Wt (web toolkit)
 WASM (WebAssembly)
 Web worker
 WebGL

X 

 XMLHttpRequest
 XULJet
 YUI Library
 YUI Rich Text Editor
 Yamanner
 Yeoman (software)

Z 

 ZK (framework)
 Zarafa (software)
 Zimbra

Indexes of computer topics